Sidrabene is a small village in Salgale Parish, Jelgava Municipality in the Semigallia region of Latvia (from 2009 until 2021, it was part of the former Ozolnieki Municipality). The village is located approximately 52 km from the capital, Riga.

Towns and villages in Latvia
Jelgava Municipality
Semigallia